Florent Olivier Sylvain Hanin (born 4 February 1990) is a French professional footballer who plays as a left back for Ligue 2 club Paris FC.

Career

Le Havre
An academy product of French top division side Le Havre, Hanin started his senior career there in 2008. He was unable to break into the first team, and spent three years playing for the reserve team in the French amateur division.

Leixões
Hanin signed on a free transfer for Segunda Liga club Leixões S.C. on 18 May 2011. He was a regular starter for the club in the 2011–12 season, and stated in 2015 that this was his turning point for his professional career.

Braga
After his contract with Leixões expired, he was signed by Primeira Liga club S.C. Braga on 1 July 2012. However, he became the third choice for left back, and never played for the first team. He spent the first half season playing regularly for the reserve squad in Segunda Liga, before being sent on loan to fellow Primeira Liga club Moreirense F.C. on 15 January 2013. He played for the latter club for the rest of the 2012–13 season, but was unable to keep them from getting relegated. He had another loan spell at the club in the next season, but the loan was terminated on 1 January 2014. He was signed on a six-month loan by Greek Superleague Panetolikos F.C. on 17 January 2014, and featured frequently for the club.

Lierse
On 1 July 2014, Hanin was signed by Belgian Pro League club Lierse S.K. on a permanent deal. Hanin describes this as «A very bad experience. It showed me the bad side of football, the worst period I've experienced.» After an initially good period, the team lost three matches and the coach was fired. Due to a conflict between the sporting director and the club president, a new coach with a radically different playing style was brought in. As Hanin struggled with the long-ball type of play, he did not play under the new coach. He was released by the club in the winter transfer window, having only played 9 matches for the club.

Strømsgodset
Hanin was signed on a one-year contract by Norwegian Tippeliga club Strømsgodset Toppfotball on 23 March 2015, becoming the only signing for the club before the 2015 season. The club commented that they had studied the French player thoroughly with the analysis program InStat Football, and described the player as an «offensive, quick and skilled left back».

Hanin told French football magazine So Foot that the Norwegian club originally wanted to sign him for two years, but due to a groin problem, the contract was set to one year, with a possible 2–3 year extension.

St. Gallen
On 5 January 2016, it was confirmed, that Hanin had signed a contract with Swiss Super League club FC St. Gallen.

Career statistics

References

External links
 

1990 births
Living people
People from Harfleur
Sportspeople from Seine-Maritime
French footballers
French sportspeople of Algerian descent
Association football defenders
Belgian Pro League players
Liga Portugal 2 players
Eliteserien players
Swiss Super League players
Super League Greece players
Primeira Liga players
Ligue 2 players
Le Havre AC players
Leixões S.C. players
S.C. Braga players
S.C. Braga B players
Moreirense F.C. players
Panetolikos F.C. players
Strømsgodset Toppfotball players
FC St. Gallen players
C.F. Os Belenenses players
Vitória S.C. players
Lierse S.K. players
Paris FC players
French expatriate footballers
French expatriate sportspeople in Portugal
Expatriate footballers in Portugal
French expatriate sportspeople in Greece
Expatriate footballers in Greece
French expatriate sportspeople in Norway
Expatriate footballers in Norway
French expatriate sportspeople in Belgium
Expatriate footballers in Belgium
French expatriate sportspeople in Switzerland
Expatriate footballers in Switzerland
Footballers from Normandy